Auraptene is a natural bioactive monoterpene coumarin ether. It was first isolated from members of the genus Citrus.

Auraptene has shown some effect as a chemopreventative agent against cancers of liver, skin, tongue, esophagus, and colon in rodent models.

See also
 C19H22O3

References 

Terpeno-phenolic compounds
Coumarins
Ethers